The Americas Zone was one of three zones of regional competition in the 1999 Fed Cup.

Group I
Venue: Buenos Aires T.C., Buenos Aires, Argentina (outdoor clay)
Date: 13–18 April

The ten teams were randomly divided into two pools of five teams to compete in round-robin competitions. The teams that finished first in the pools played-off to determine which team would partake in the World Group II Play-offs, while the teams that finished last in the pools would be relegated to Group II for 2000.

Pools

Play-off

  advanced to World Group II Play-offs.
  and  relegated to Group II in 2000.

Group II
Venue: Costa Rica Country Club, San José, Costa Rica (outdoor hard)
Date: 23–27 February

The sixteen teams were randomly divided into four pools of four teams to compete in round-robin competitions. The top teams of each pool play-off in a two-round knockout stage with the two winners advancing to Group I for 2000.

Pools

Knockout stage

  and  advanced to Group I for 2000.

See also
Fed Cup structure

References

 Fed Cup Profile, Argentina
 Fed Cup Profile, Colombia
 Fed Cup Profile, Paraguay
 Fed Cup Profile, Mexico
 Fed Cup Profile, Venezuela
 Fed Cup Profile, Canada
 Fed Cup Profile, Brazil
 Fed Cup Profile, Chile
 Fed Cup Profile, Uruguay
 Fed Cup Profile, Dominican Republic
 Fed Cup Profile, Costa Rica
 Fed Cup Profile, Cuba
 Fed Cup Profile, Bahamas
 Fed Cup Profile, El Salvador
 Fed Cup Profile, Bolivia
 Fed Cup Profile, Barbados
 Fed Cup Profile, Panama
 Fed Cup Profile, Peru
 Fed Cup Profile, Jamaica
 Fed Cup Profile, Bermuda

External links
 Fed Cup website

 
Americas
 Sports competitions in Buenos Aires
Tennis tournaments in Argentina
Sport in San José, Costa Rica
Tennis tournaments in Costa Rica